DB, dB or db may refer to:

Arts, entertainment and media
 Daily Bugle or The DB, a fictional New York City newspaper in Marvel Comics
 Doing Business Report, by the World Bank Group

Music
 D♭ (musical note)
 DB Records, Atlanta, Georgia, US
 The dB's, a band in the 1980
 DJ DB, a New York-based British DJ

Brands and enterprises
 DB (car), a French automobile maker
 Brit Air (IATA airline code)
 DB Breweries, a New Zealand company
 DB Networks, an American information security firm
 Deutsche Bahn, a German railway company since 1994
 Deutsche Bank (NYSE symbol), a multinational investment bank headquartered in Frankfurt, Germany
 Deutsche Bundesbahn, national railway company of the Federal Republic of Germany, 1949-1994
 Dolderbahn, a rack railway in Zürich, Switzerland

Law enforcement
 Dead body, term used in US law enforcement jargon
 State Security Service (FR Yugoslavia) (DB), Serbian secret police

Places
 Dâmbovița County (ISO 3166-2:RO code), Romania
 DB Draw, a bridge over the Passaic River, US
 Discovery Bay, a residential development in Hong Kong
 Dobyns-Bennett High School, Kingsport, Tennessee, US

Science and technology
 Database (DB), an organized collection of data on a computer system.
 .db, file extension for some database files
 Decibel (dB), acoustics and electronics unit
 Dubnium, symbol Db, a chemical element
 dyne:bolic, a Linux distribution
 dry bulb, a temperature definition

Other uses
 ȸ, the db-digraph a ligature of "d" and "b" in African linguistics
 Defensive back, a position in American football and Canadian football
 Defined benefit pension plan, a scheme for retirement plans
 double-breasted, a style of garment with wide, overlapping front flaps

See also
 DB, the model names of some Aston Martin vehicles
 David Brown (entrepreneur) (1904–1993), whose initials are on a series of Aston Martin cars
 DB9, DB25, etc., types of D-subminiature connector
 D&B (disambiguation)